Noko Phineas Masipa (born 16 October 1968) is a South African politician who is a Member of Parliament since the 2019 general election for the Democratic Alliance. In August 2022, Masipa was appointed as the Shadow Minister of  Agriculture, Land Reform and Rural Development

Education
Masipa has a Master of Business Administration degree from the Management College of Southern Africa (MANCOSA), a Bachelor of Commerce degree from the University of South Africa, and a national diploma in nursing from the Sarleh Dollie Nursing College in collaboration with the University of the Western Cape.

Additionally, Masipa did a short course on the business of wine at the University of Cape Town Graduate School of Business. He holds a certificate in leadership from the University of Pretoria and a certificate in marketing from the Cape Peninsula University of Technology. At the University of Dublin and University of Limerick in the Republic of Ireland, he fulfilled an International Ireland Leadership Programme.

Early Childhood
Phineas Masipa was born in GaManhlodi popularly known as Cooperspark, in Limpopo's Aganang Municipality. He matriculated at Mosonya Secondary School at GaManhlodi Village, Moletjie. He finished his primary school at Borume Primary School. Started his high school journey at Nokanantshwana Junior Secondary School. Due to finances he dropped out for two years after completing the then standard eight.

Career
Masipa worked in the banking sector before becoming active in politics. He was 20th on the Democratic Alliance's national list for the 2019 general election and won a seat in the National Assembly at the election.

In June 2019, Masipa became an alternate member of the Portfolio Committee on Agriculture, Land Reform and Rural Development.

On 18 August 2022, Masipa was appointed by John Steenhuisen as the DA's Shadow Minister of Agriculture, Land Reform and Rural Development. He succeeded Annette Steyn, who retired from politics in June 2022.

References

External links

Living people
1968 births
Place of birth missing (living people)
People from the Western Cape
Democratic Alliance (South Africa) politicians
Members of the National Assembly of South Africa
21st-century South African politicians